The Chief of Defence (abbreviated as CHOD), is the professional head and commander of the Belgian Armed Forces. He is the highest official within the Ministry of Defence and the Chief of the Defence Staff. He reports directly to the Minister of Defence and is responsible for advising the Minister, for the implementation of defence policy and for the administration of the department. The current Chief of Defence is Admiral Michel Hofman, since July 2020.

Chiefs of Staff (1958−present)

References

Military appointments of Belgium
Belgium